Glen Douglas Amerson (born November 24, 1938) is a former professional American football player who played defensive back in 1961 for the Philadelphia Eagles of the National Football League. He graduated from Munday High School in 1957 and played collegiality for the Texas Tech Red Raiders.

External links
Pro-Football-Reference

1938 births
Living people
People from Munday, Texas
Players of American football from Texas
American football defensive backs
Texas Tech Red Raiders football players
Philadelphia Eagles players